Liracraea otakauica is a species of sea snail, a marine gastropod mollusk in the family Mangeliidae.

There is one subspecies: Liracraea odhneri benthicola Dell, 1956

Description
The length of the shell attains 7.8 mm, its diameter 2.7 mm.

Distribution
This species is endemic to New Zealand occurs off Otago.

References

 Powell, A.W.B. 1979: New Zealand Mollusca: Marine, Land and Freshwater Shells, Collins, Auckland
Spencer, H.G., Marshall, B.A. & Willan, R.C. (2009). Checklist of New Zealand living Mollusca. pp. 196–219. in: Gordon, D.P. (ed.) New Zealand inventory of biodiversity. Volume one. Kingdom Animalia: Radiata, Lophotrochozoa, Deuterostomia. Canterbury University Press, Christchurch.

External links
  Tucker, J.K. 2004 Catalog of recent and fossil turrids (Mollusca: Gastropoda). Zootaxa 682:1–1295.

otakauica
Gastropods described in 1942
Gastropods of New Zealand